The Sea Organization (also known as the Sea Org) is a Scientology organization, which the Church of Scientology describes as a "fraternal religious order, comprising the religion’s most dedicated members". All Scientology management organizations are controlled exclusively by members of the Sea Org. David Miscavige, the de facto leader of Scientology, is the highest-ranking Sea Org officer, holding the rank of captain.

The Sea Org has been described as a paramilitary organization and as a private naval force, having operated several vessels in its past and displaying a maritime tradition. Some ex-members and scholars have described the Sea Org as a totalitarian organization marked by intensive surveillance and a lack of freedom.

In a 1992 memorandum by the Church of Scientology International, the following information was provided to the Internal Revenue Service with regards to nature of the Sea Org:

The Sea Org was established on August 12, 1967, by L. Ron Hubbard, the founder of Dianetics and Scientology, initially on board three ships, the Diana, the Athena, and the Apollo, with the latter serving as flagship.

In 1971, the Sea Org assumed responsibility for the church's ecclesiastical development, and in particular the delivery of the upper levels of its auditing and training, known as the Operating Thetan or "OT" levels. In 1981, under the aegis of the Commodore's Messenger Organization led by David Miscavige, the Sea Org dissolved the Guardian's Office (GO) and assumed full responsibility for the church's international management, later reassigning the GO's duties to the Office of Special Affairs in 1983 during the corporate restructuring of the Church.

It moved to land-based organizations in 1975, though maritime customs persist, with many members wearing naval-style uniforms and addressing both male and female officers as "sir." In 1985, the church purchased a  motor vessel, the Freewinds, which docks in Curaçao in the southern Caribbean and is used as a religious retreat and training center, staffed entirely by Sea Org members. Sea Org members make a lifetime commitment to Scientology by signing a billion-year contract officially described as a symbolic pledge. In exchange, members are given free room and board, as well as a small weekly allowance. Sea Org members agree to strict codes of discipline, such as disavowing premarital sex, working long hours (on average at least 100 hours per week) and living in communal housing called "berthings." They are allowed to marry, but must relinquish their membership if they have or want to raise children.

Background

According to Hubbard, much of the galaxy, including Earth (known as "Teegeeack"), was ruled tens of millions of years ago by the Galactic Confederacy. The confederacy was controlled by a tyrant named Xenu, who was eventually overthrown by a group within the Galactic Confederacy known as the "Loyal Officers". Religious scholar Hugh Urban writes that the Sea Org is modeled after these Loyal Officers. Urban also describes the Sea Org, with the naval uniforms and ranks, as an idealized re-creation of Hubbard's own World War II military career. He also states that the Sea Org is reminiscent of the "Soldiers of Light" in Hubbard's science fiction story collection Ole Doc Methuselah.

Academic Stephen A. Kent has argued that at least part of the reason for the establishment of the Sea Org was that the Church of Scientology's practices encountered resistance from the American Food and Drug Administration and the Internal Revenue Service, as well as from the governments of the United Kingdom, Australia, and Rhodesia. Sailing on the high seas meant the church could escape their attention.

In 2000 the number of Sea Org members was listed at around 7,000. As of 2009, the number was listed by the church at around 5,000. Most Sea Org members reside in church complexes in Los Angeles, Clearwater, Copenhagen, London, Saint Hill, and Sydney, with some at smaller centers or on assignment elsewhere.

According to scholar Susan Raine, Hubbard created the Sea Org as a "kind of space navy, melding SF space ideas with Earthbound naval ones." Hubbard biographer Jon Atack recalled a confidential Sea Org executive directive that claimed that governments of the world were on the verge of collapse: "The Sea Org would survive and pick up the pieces."

Structure

Estates Project Force
All new recruits are required to complete compulsory novitiate before they are allowed to join the Sea Org, which has been described as a boot camp. During this phase, known as the Estates Project Force (EPF), recruits are not considered to be full Sea Org members. They are required to address all members as "sir," regardless of rank, and must run everywhere instead of walking. Married couples are separated for the duration of the EPF and are not allowed to have private or intimate contact with each other.

While on the EPF, recruits are assigned an intensive daily regimen divided between five hours of manual labor and five hours of study and indoctrination known as "Product Zero". Scientology courses that are required to complete the EPF include:
Basic Study Manual, an introductory course in Study Technology, a simplified version of the Student Hat course.
Introduction to Scientology Ethics, a basic course in Scientology ethics.
Basic Sea Org Member Hat, a course on the basics of membership in the Sea Org and what is expected.
Welcome to the Sea Org, a series of taped lectures originally given by L. Ron Hubbard in October 1969 to new recruits.
Personal Grooming Course, a course on personal hygiene.
The EPF does not have a definite schedule. A recruit graduates the EPF as soon as all the required courses have been completed and upon successfully undergoing a mandatory "7A Security Check," they are then allowed to join the Sea Org as full members. Sea Org recruits verbally agree to an 18-point code or pledge as part of a swearing in ceremony. Members formally reaffirm their acceptance of this code annually on August 12, the day when the organization was founded.

Ships and land bases

In 1967, the Church of Scientology purchased HMS Royal Scotsman which they renamed the Apollo, which was used as the Sea Org's Flagship. In 1975, the church sold the Sea Org's ships and moved the organization to land bases around the world, which as of 2003, were operating in Clearwater, Copenhagen, London, Los Angeles, Mexico City, Saint Hill Manor in the UK, and Sydney, with smaller offices in Budapest, Johannesburg, Madrid, Milan, Moscow, and Toronto. In 1987, they purchased a ship, La Bohème, which they renamed Freewinds. OT VIII, the highest auditing level of Scientology currently available, is exclusive to the Freewinds and can only be undertaken there. The ship also hosts various courses, seminars, conventions and events throughout the year, including the annual Maiden Voyage celebration.

Billion-year commitment
According to Hubbard, the Sea Org's mission is "an exploration into both time and space". Sea Org members act as goodwill representatives and administrators of Scientology; all policy and administrative posts in the church's key organizations are held by Sea Org members. Most members are given room, board and a weekly allowance of about $75.

In accordance with Scientology beliefs, members are expected to return to the Sea Org when they are reborn; the Sea Org's motto is "We Come Back". Members must therefore sign a symbolic billion-year "religious commitment", pledging to "get ethics in on this planet and the universe." The church contends that the agreement is not a legally binding contract and is merely a symbolic demonstration of the dedication members are expected to give to the organization, and that they are free to leave if they wish. After signing, members report to the Estates Project Force, the Sea Org's induction program; Melton writes that members may take several years between signing the commitment and attending the induction. Once induction is completed, the final decision to join is made.

Members who leave the Sea Org are issued a "freeloader's bill", retroactively billing them for any auditing or training they have received. Although the bill is not legally enforceable, these Scientologists may not receive services at any Scientology organization until they pay the bill and perform an ethics course.

Marriage and family

From the early 1970s to the start of the 21st century, the children of Sea Org members were often placed in the Cadet Org. Sea Org members may marry one another, but are not permitted to marry outside the organization; extra-marital sex is also prohibited. According to Melton, couples with children must leave the Sea Org and return to other staff positions within the church until the child is six years old; thereafter the children are raised communally and allowed to visit their parents in the Sea Org on weekends. Children of members have themselves joined the Sea Org when they came of age. Several former members have said they were advised (or even forced) to have an abortion when they became pregnant to avoid being sent to lower organizations. Scientology presents itself as opposed to abortion and actively speaks out against it in its publications.

Rehabilitation Project Force

The Rehabilitation Project Force (RPF) was created in January 1974 as a system of work camps set up by the Sea Org, intended to isolate and rehabilitate members who have not lived up to the church's expectations, have failed security checks, or have violated certain policies. Melton writes that the RPF areas are located within Sea Org facilities, and that there are no locks on the doors.

Many ex-Sea Org members have reported gruelling treatment. According to Melton, there are eight hours of physical work – such as painting, plumbing, and upkeep of grounds – six days a week; the work may involve teaching the member a skill such as carpentry. Members also spend five hours a day studying with or auditing a partner. Former Scientologist Jon Atack argued, in A Piece of Blue Sky (1990), that treatment of Sea Org members in the RPF was a "careful imitation of techniques long-used by the military to obtain unquestioning obedience and immediate compliance to orders, or more simply to break men's spirits ..." One former member, Gerry Armstrong, said that during his time in the Sea Org in the 1970s he spent over two years banished to the RPF as a punishment:

It was essentially a prison to which crew who were considered nonproducers, security risks, or just wanted to leave the Sea Org, were assigned. Hubbard's RPF policies established the conditions. RPF members were segregated and not allowed to communicate to anyone else. They had their own spaces and were not allowed in normal crew areas of the ship. They ate after normal crew had eaten, and only whatever was left over from the crew meal. Their berthing was the worst on board, in a roach-infested, filthy and unventilated cargo hold. They wore black boilersuits, even in the hottest weather. They were required to run everywhere. Discipline was harsh and bizarre, with running laps of the ship assigned for the slightest infraction like failing to address a senior with "Sir." Work was hard and the schedule rigid with seven hours' sleep time from lights out to lights on, short meal breaks, no liberties and no free time ... <p>When one young woman ordered into the RPF took the assignment too lightly, Hubbard created the RPF's RPF and assigned her to it, an even more degrading experience, cut off even from the RPF, kept under guard, forced to clean the ship's bilges, and allowed even less sleep.

Ranks

Analysis
Several scholars, writers and former members have compared the Sea Org to a paramilitary group. In Tom Cruise: An Unauthorized Biography (2008), Andrew Morton described it as a "fraternal paramilitary organization", and wrote that members are instructed to read The Art of War by General Sun Tzu, and On War by General Carl von Clausewitz. He wrote that Scientology leader David Miscavige created an elite unit within the Sea Org called the "SEALs", named after the United States Navy SEALs, who receive better lodging, sustenance, and uniforms than other Sea Org members.

Lawrence Wright wrote in The New Yorker in 2011 that the Sea Org used small children drawn from Scientology families for what the article described as forced child labor. The article described extremely inhumane conditions, with children spending years in the Sea Org, sequestered from mainstream life.

See also
List of Scientology organizations

References

Further reading
Books and papers
Atack, Jon. A Piece of Blue Sky. Carol Publishing Group, 1990.
Dawson, Lorne L. Comprehending Cults: The Sociology of New Religious Movements. Oxford University Press, 2006.
Kent, Stephen A. "Scientology: Is this a religion?", Marburg Journal of Religion, vol 4, no 1, July 1999.
Kent, Stephen A. From Slogans to Mantras: Social Protest and Religious Conversion in the Late Vietnam War Era. Syracuse University Press, 2001.

Melton, J. Gordon. "Birth of a Religion," in James R. Lewis (ed.). Scientology. Oxford University Press, 2009.
Morton, Andrew. Tom Cruise: An Unauthorized Biography. Macmillan, 2008.
Reitman, Janet. Inside Scientology: The Story of America's Most Secretive Religion. Houghton Mifflin Harcourt, 2011.

Urban, Hugh. The Church of Scientology: A History of a New Religion. Princeton University Press, 2011.

News items
Cooper, Anderson. "Inside the Church of Scientology", CNN, 2 December 2005.
Farley, Robert. "The unperson", St. Petersburg Times, 24 June 2006.
Reitman, Janet. "Inside Scientology", Rolling Stone, 23 February 2006.
Squires, Rosie. "The L. Ron scandal," Sunday Telegraph (Sydney, Australia), 29 November 2009.
St. Petersburg Times. "About Scientology", 18 July 2004.
Welkos, Robert W. and Sappell, Joel. "Defectors Recount Lives of Hard Work, Punishment", Los Angeles Times, 26 June 1990.
Wright, Lawrence. "The Apostate", The New Yorker, 14 February 2011.

External links
 Lattin, Don. "Leaving the Fold: Third-generation Scientologist grows disillusioned with faith", San Francisco Chronicle, 12 February 2001.
 

Scientology organizations
Religion in Riverside County, California
Religious orders
Religious organizations established in 1967
Paramilitary organizations based in the United States